The NBR F Class (LNER Class J88) was a class of 0-6-0 tank locomotives, designed by William P. Reid on the North British Railway. They were used for dockyard shunting duties.

Background
When the North British railway required more dock shunting tank locomotives in 1904, rather than order further copies of the railway's standard G class (LNER class Y9) 0-4-0ST , William P. Reid introduced a completely new 0-6-0T locomotive design.

Design

Construction
All thirty five locomotives were built at the NBR's Cowlairs Works in five batches between 1904 and 1919.

Service history
They were used on docks and harbours on both the east and west coasts of Scotland. They were usually allocated to St. Margaret's (Edinburgh), Eastfield (Glasgow), Thornton, Kipps, Polmont, Sirling and Haymarket (Edinburgh) locomotive depots.

At the grouping in 1923, they all passed to the London and North Eastern Railway, who classified them as class J88. They were all still in service at Nationalisation in 1948. BR added 60000 to their LNER 1946 number.

Withdrawal
One locomotive, No. 68341, was withdrawn in 1954 after falling into Kirkcaldy harbour, but later the class were gradually displaced by diesel shunters during the 1950s, with the last withdrawn in December 1962. All members of the class were scrapped, and there is no surviving example in preservation.

References

F
0-6-0T locomotives
Railway locomotives introduced in 1904
Standard gauge steam locomotives of Great Britain
Scrapped locomotives
Shunting locomotives